Birkan Kirdar (born 7 February 2002), is an Australian professional footballer who last played as an attacking midfielder for Melbourne Victory in the A-League Men.

Club career

Melbourne Victory
The youngest player chosen in Melbourne Victory's youth squad for the 2017-18 National Youth League season, Kirdar made his debut for Melbourne Victory Youth at the age of 15, coming on in the 76th minute against Perth Glory Youth.

Kirdar made his first-team debut for Melbourne Victory in an AFC Champions League match against Shanghai SIPG F.C., coming on as an 87th-minute substitute for Pierce Waring in an eventual 2–1 win. At 16 years and 70 days, Kirdar became the Victory's youngest ever debutant.

On 1 June 2018, Kirdar signed his first professional contract with Victory, through till the end of the 2019/20 season. On 29 September 2020, Kirdar re-signed with Victory for the 2020/21 season. In September 2022, he left Melbourne Victory.

International career
Kirdar represented Australia at the 2017 AFF U-15 Championship, the 2018 AFC U-16 Championship qualification and the 2018 AFC U-16 Championship.

Personal life
Kirdar is of Turkish descent, and his grandfather helped found the Turkish-Australian club Anadoluspor, also known as Hume City FC.

Honours

Club
Melbourne Victory
FFA Cup: 2021

References

2002 births
Living people
Association football midfielders
Australian soccer players
Australia youth international soccer players
Australian people of Turkish descent
Melbourne Victory FC players
A-League Men players
National Premier Leagues players
People from the City of Hume
Soccer players from Melbourne